The United States House of Representatives elections in California, 1914 was an election for California's delegation to the United States House of Representatives, which occurred as part of the general election of the House of Representatives on November 3, 1914. Republicans lost two seats, one to the Progressive Party and one to the Prohibition Party.

Overview

Delegation composition

Results

District 1

District 2

District 3

District 4

District 5

District 6

District 7

District 8

District 9

District 10

District 11

See also
64th United States Congress
Political party strength in California
Political party strength in U.S. states
United States House of Representatives elections, 1914

References
California Elections Page
Office of the Clerk of the House of Representatives

External links
California Legislative District Maps (1911-Present)
RAND California Election Returns: District Definitions

1914
California
United States House of Representatives